Tracey Lindberg is a writer, scholar, lawyer and Indigenous Rights activist from the Kelly Lake Cree Nation in British Columbia. She is Cree-Métis and a member of the As'in'i'wa'chi Ni'yaw Nation Rocky Mountain Cree.

She won the Governor General's Gold Medal with her dissertation on "Critical Indigenous Legal Theory," and her academic work has awarded her a Canada Research Chair in Indigenous Traditional Knowledge. Lindberg works with Elders and Spiritual Leaders in Indigenous communities to record and translate Indigenous laws. She spent nineteen years teaching at Athabasca University in Alberta before moving to the University of Ottawa.

Her debut novel, Birdie, was published in 2015 and is a national best-seller. It presents the path of healing through the main character, Bernice Meetos, a Cree woman who is trying to reconcile with her tragic past. It has been said that Birdie demonstrates the effects of colonization, intergenerational trauma on Indigenous families and speaks to the universal story of self-discovery. The novel was selected for the 2016 edition of Canada Reads, where it was defended by entrepreneur Bruce Poon Tip. The novel was also a finalist for an Alberta Literary Award, the Kobo Emerging Writer Prize and a long-listed selection of the International DUBLIN Literary Award

Lindberg also performs as a blues music singer.

Education 
Lindberg received her bachelor of law University of Saskatchewan, masters in law at Harvard University, and doctorate in law the University of Ottawa. She was the first Indigenous woman in Canada to complete her graduate law degree at Harvard University. She is also thought to be the first Indigenous woman to receive a doctorate in law from a Canadian university.

Early writing 
Lindberg's literary works demonstrate the importance of Indigenous tradition, resiliency, and how narratives can empower marginalized populations. Lindberg's written work includes essays and dissertations on Indigenous governance, Indigenous Feminism and traditional Indigenous education.

Career (1997-2018) 
In 1997, Dr. Lindberg was hired to teach Criminal Justice at Athabasca University in Alberta. In 2001, she helped to establish the Centre for World Indigenous Knowledge and Research and became director of Indigenous Education. In 2010 she became Athabasca's fourth Canadian Research Chair. Her focus was on Indigenous Legal Orders, Laws and Traditions. At this point she began to split her time between Athabasca University and the University of Ottawa and transferred there full-time in 2016. 
Lindberg is a professor of Indigenous law and government at the University of Ottawa. She was co-author of the 2012 academic text Discovering Indigenous Lands: The Doctrine of Discovery in the English Colonies. Lindberg's areas of research include traditional Cree law, legal advocacy, and activism for Indigenous people, as well as Indigenous women. In addition to teaching at the University of Ottawa, she teaches at the Native Law Program and has written/taught courses about Aboriginal business law, Indigenous women, and courses on dispute resolution.

Faculty of Law 
At the University of Ottawa, Lindberg is an associate professor of the Faculty of Law. Her work in academia and law has informed other non-Indigenous lawyers and professionals on Indigenous legal theory. Lindberg's passion for re-traditionalizing Indigenous law is noted in her analysis of how Canadian practice violates Indigenous governance. Within the Faculty of Law at UOttawa, the Common Law Section offered an Indigenous Law Program for the first time in September 2016. Lindberg and other professors taught sections such as, Indigenous legal principles, criminal property, and constitutional law. This course at UOttawa is called "Maanaajitoon/Torts," which includes components of Anishinaabe, Haudenosaunee, Dene, and Métis Law.

Academia 
After her Governor General's (GG) Award in 2007, Lindberg continued to publish work that addressed the importance of Indigenous Rights and traditional practices. Many of her publications have appeared in co-edited books with other distinguished recipients of the GG Awards, such as Kim Campbell and Robert Bourassa.

Reconciliation (2016) 
Much of Lindberg's academic work deals with the multi-layered issue of reconciliation for Indigenous communities with Canada. In 2016, Lindberg delivered a speech called : Indigenous Lands and Peoples' Respect, Reciprocity and Relationships. It was presented at Vancouver Island University's second annual event for Pre-Confederation Treaties and Reconciliation.  Her approach to reconciliation focuses on a complex process with many factors involved, rather than a linear process. Lindberg incorporates reconciliation through her work in the community and through her written work, both literary and fictional. Douglas White, who is a Director of the Centre for Pre-Confederation Treaties and Reconciliation, admires Lindberg's perspective on reconciliation.

In 2017, Lindberg appeared at The Indigenous Writers' Gathering, which facilitates reconciliation between Indigenous and non-Indigenous people through the sharing of Indigenous literature. It was part of the IndigenousReads Campaign and encompassed discussions with many accomplished Indigenous authors who shared their perspectives on overcoming adversity and building resistance.

Activism 
Lindberg's social and political activism in Indigenous law, governance, education, reconciliation, and with Indigenous women, has awarded her the position as an Associate Professor in the Centre for World Indigenous Knowledge and Research. In 2018, she spoke at the first Indigenous-led summit that focused on building solutions and promoting healing from the effects of the Indian Act. The summit, determiNATION: Moving Beyond the Indian Act  brought together Elders, spiritual leaders, Indigenous youth, scholars, and the Minister of Crown-Indigenous Relations to speak to issues impacting Indigenous communities. Lindberg has given presentations on the strength of survivors of abuse that also come up in her book Birdie. She advocates for the narratives of Indigenous peoples to be recognized, especially for Indigenous women and their cultural identities. Her work includes advocating on behalf of Indigenous youth, where she focuses on empowerment and teaching the importance of Indigenous language and story telling.

Lindberg's political activism focuses on the complexities of reconciliation for Indigenous people. In 2017, her lecture at Vancouver Island University's Indigenous Speaker Series was called (W)rec(k)-onciliation, to show the prevalence of institutionalized racism and how there is still work to be done in order to advance the reconciliation of Indigenous people with Canada.

Indigenous women's legal advocacy  
Lindberg advocates for Indigenous women, due to the fact that many narratives about Indigenous women have been used to impair their agency, knowledge, and present them in destructive ways. She targets this issue by writing counter-narratives, in order reclaim the socio-cultural stories in regard to Indigenous women's history, which can be seen in her work. Lindberg's  Indigenous Women's Legal Advocacy provides an anti-colonial approach to legal assistance and provides proper representation for Indigenous women.

Missing and murdered Indigenous women 
Lindberg has also focused on the crisis of missing and murdered Indigenous women and girls in Canada and the United States with her article, "Violence against Indigenous women and the case of Cindy Gladue," published in 2015. The article gives agency to families of the missing and murdered and addresses the systemic violence that has impacted Indigenous women.

Survivors of sexual violence 
In addition to Lindberg's work with Indigenous women, she works with women of many backgrounds who have experienced sexual violence. In 2018, she facilitated a workshop at Carleton University called "Survivors Writing Circle," which teaches writing as a tool for healing and recovery for survivors of sexual violence.

Birdie (2015) 
Birdie, published in 2015 was Lindberg's debut novel and has been said to fill the gaps of what Canadian literature has been missing. Majority of Canadian literature has overlooked Indigenous women writers, especially novels about the experiences of Indigenous women. Birdie provides resurgence and representation for Indigenous women and validity of their experiences, as well as the journey of self-discovery. Not only does Lindberg's novel focus on the experiences of Indigenous women, it also offers a universal story of healing and recovery. Birdie is enriched with elements of Cree culture which incorporate storytelling, tradition, and language. Lindberg purposely disrupts the chronological order of time and challenges the linear order, as most of the story takes place from Bernice Meetoos's bed in an almost dream state, shifting between the past and present.  Many reviews have said that Birdie challenges Canada's dark history in regard to the colonization of Indigenous peoples, in contrast to Canada being seen for its image of national kindness.

Indigenous women 
Lindberg gives agency to the voices of Indigenous women as she presents the journey of Bernice Meetoos, a Cree-Métis woman who becomes withdrawn from the present in order to work through her traumatic past. Throughout her novel, Lindberg encourages people to be responsible for one another, which opens up an honest dialogue and begins the conversation of reconciliation. This novel addresses the epidemic of Missing and Murdered Indigenous Women and girls in North America, and the economic and social inequities in Indigenous communities.

Cree Poetic Aesthetics 
Lindberg uses Cree Poetic Aesthetics throughout her novel with the use of traditional song, Cree Language, Cree law, and humor. In Cree Poetic Aesthetics, Lindberg uses the technique of narrative to give identity to Indigenous people in Canadian literature. The way in which Lindberg constructs her sentences, translates Cree language, inserts politically charged words, and uses self-reflection of the main character demonstrate many of the linguistic tools that re-claim Indigenous identity. Lindberg uses Plains Cree language by translating Cree into English in footnotes. She also reclaims certain racial derogatives through re-appropriation.

Cree Law

Wahkohtowin  
Lindberg uses the relational tool of Cree Law in her novel Birdie. It is based on the principle that we are all bound by the universe and have a reciprocal obligation to treat one another with care. The law is called Wahkohtowin; Lindberg wanted to use this to explore the intimate bond we have with one another, on a human level.

Introduction of Birdie in High Schools 
Bruce Poon Tip was on the panel of the 2016 Canada Reads Competition and was Birdie's defender. He saw Birdie as a piece of work that encompasses Indigenous resistance to colonization. This motivated him to introduce the novel into High Schools, in which his first project launched 10, 000 copies into High Schools. Bruce Poon Tip sees Birdie as a way to encourage people to re-traditionalize and de-colonize.

Awards 
Lindberg received a Best Book award from the National Post in 2015. She was also a finalist for Canada Reads in 2016. Lindberg received the Governor General's Award in 2007 upon convocation for her dissertation in Critical Indigenous Legal Theory.  Lindberg's academic work awarded her a Canada Research Chair in Indigenous Traditional Knowledge, Legal Orders, and Law. Lindberg's 2015 Birdie was a national best seller, a CBC Canada Reads finalist, a best book of the year, a finalist for an Alberta Literary Award and the Kobo Emerging Writer Prize, and a long listed selection of the International DUBLIN Literary Award. Lindberg was also named a CBC "writer to watch".

In 2018, Lindberg was named a Fellow of the Royal Society of Canada.

Presentations 
Strength of Survivors (2018): Lindberg speaks to some of the themes that come up in her novel Birdie and asks her audiences to become more involved in Indigenous narratives. She makes many connections to women of all different backgrounds who share similar experiences of abuse.
Don't Take No for an Answer (2018): A youth centered presentation, Lindberg shares her personal story of what has contributed to her career choice. She focuses on youth empowerment, doing what brings you joy, and the importance of goal setting.
Relationships & Reconciliation (2018): Lindberg talks about boundary setting in maintaining healthy relationships and how this impacts our understanding of responsibility, territoriality, and how it challenges certain perspectives of reconciliation.
cultuRED Talks: Anniversary Edition with Tracey Lindberg (2016): Lindberg shares the art of Indigenous storytelling with her audience, as well as tools for renewal and survival.

Works and publications 
 Lindberg, Tracey (2015). Birdie. HarperCollins Publishers.  
 Lindberg, Tracey (2015). Daniel David Moses: Spoken and Written Explorations of His Work Co-edited with David Brundage. 
 Lindberg, Tracey (2010). Discovering Indigenous Lands: The Doctrine of Discovery in the English Colonies 
 Lindberg, Tracey (2007). Dissertation on Critical Indigenous Legal Theory

References

External links

First Nations novelists
First Nations women writers
First Nations musicians
21st-century Canadian novelists
Canadian women novelists
Academic staff of Athabasca University
Living people
21st-century Canadian women writers
Cree people
Canadian blues singers
Canadian non-fiction writers
Year of birth missing (living people)
21st-century First Nations writers
Canadian women non-fiction writers
University of Saskatchewan alumni
University of Ottawa Faculty of Law alumni
Harvard Law School alumni
Fellows of the Royal Society of Canada
Canadian indigenous women academics
First Nations academics
21st-century Canadian non-fiction writers
21st-century Canadian women singers